Jeb is a masculine given name or nickname.

Jeb or JEB may also refer to:

Jeb (play), a 1946 play by Robert Ardrey
Japan Evangelistic Band, a religious organization
Joint Examining Board
The Journal of Experimental Biology
Junctional epidermolysis bullosa (disambiguation)
Junularo Esperantista Brita, an organization of Esperanto-speakers
JEB Decompiler, a multi-architecture decompiler and reverse-engineering platform
jeb, ISO 639-3 code for the Jebero language of Peru
¡Jeb!, the campaign slogan for Jeb Bush
Jens Bergensten, a video game developer known by his nickname "Jeb".

See also
J.E.B. v. Alabama ex rel. T.B., a 1994 U.S. Supreme Court case on juror peremptory challenges